Philippe Dupont (born 28 February 1964) is a Belgian sports shooter. He competed in two events at the 1996 Summer Olympics.

References

1964 births
Living people
Belgian male sport shooters
Olympic shooters of Belgium
Shooters at the 1996 Summer Olympics
Sportspeople from Liège